Larry Christopher Luebbers (born October 11, 1969) is a former Major League Baseball player who played with the Cincinnati Reds and the St. Louis Cardinals. He made his major league debut on July 3, 1993 against the Pittsburgh Pirates and gave up 3 earned runs in 5 innings. After the 1993 season he was traded by the Reds with Mike Anderson and Darron Cox to the Chicago Cubs for Chuck McElroy. From there Luebbers bounced around minor league organizations until 1999 when he reemerged in the majors for the Cardinals. The next year he pitched his last games in the majors for the Reds. He currently resides in Frankfort, Kentucky.

External links

 

1969 births
Living people
Cincinnati Reds players
St. Louis Cardinals players
Major League Baseball pitchers
Baseball players from Ohio
Billings Mustangs players
Cedar Rapids Reds players
Chattanooga Lookouts players
Indianapolis Indians players
Iowa Cubs players
Richmond Braves players
Memphis Redbirds players
Louisville RiverBats players
Sacramento River Cats players
Kentucky Wildcats baseball players